Guzmania rhonhofiana is a plant species in the genus Guzmania. This species is native to Colombia and Ecuador.

References

rhonhofiana
Plants described in 1939
Flora of Colombia
Flora of Ecuador
Taxobox binomials not recognized by IUCN